Epitaph is a 2007 South Korean film directed by brothers Jung Sik and Jung Bum-shik. The film is a horror film set primarily in 1942, while Korea was under the colonial rule of Japan. It is framed by scenes set in 1979.

Plot
Dr. Park Jung-nam finds a photo album dating back to his days as an intern at the Ansaeng Hospital. This triggers memories of his life. In 1942, as a young medical intern, Jung-nam's arranged marriage ended when his fiancée, whom he had never met, committed suicide. Later he was assigned to monitor the morgue late at night. There he fell in love with a corpse, which is later revealed as the body of his deceased fiancée. Soon other mysterious events take place in the hospital, involving a young girl haunted by ghosts and a serial killer targeting Japanese soldiers.

Cast
Kim Bo-kyung as Kim In-yeong
Jin Goo as Park Jeong-nam
Lee Dong-kyu as Lee Su-In
Kim Tae-woo as Kim Dong-won
Ko Joo-yeon as Asako
Park Ji-a as mother
David McInnis as father
Kim Ju-hyeon as Aoi
Kim Eung-soo as Akiyama
Choi Jae-hwan as Jae-hwan
Jeon Moo-song as Professor Park Jung-nam
Choi Dae-woong as Professor Jung
Jung Ji-ahn as Nurse Choi
Ye Soo-jung as Director of Ansang Hospital
Kong Ho-suk as Japanese General
Son Young-soon as old woman
Kim Ja-young as head nurse
Uhm Tae-goo as Japanese soldier 1
Son In-yong as Japanese soldier 2

Critical reception

The cinematography, directing and acting by horror film mainstays Kim Eung-soo and Ye Soo-jeong have earned the film praise as "visually as well as intellectually impressive, with some gorgeous cinematography and wonderfully composed shots," and "a significant contribution to rehabilitating K-horror's international reputation."

Awards and nominations
2007 Blue Dragon Film Awards
Best Cinematography: Yoon Nam-joo
Best Art Direction: Kim Yu-jeong, Lee Min-bok
Nomination - Best New Director: Jung Sik, Jung Bum-shik
Nomination - Best Lighting: Kim Ji-hoon
Nomination - Technical Award: Kim Sang-bum, Kim Jae-bum (Editing)

2007 Korean Association of Film Critics Awards
Best New Director: Jung Sik, Jung Bum-shik

2007 Korean Film Awards
Nomination - Best Art Direction: Kim Yu-jeong, Lee Min-bok
Nomination - Best Sound: Jang Gwang-su, Seo Yeong-jun
Nomination - Best New Actress: Ko Joo-yeon

2007 Director's Cut Awards
Best New Director: Jung Sik, Jung Bum-shik

2008 Asian Film Awards
Nomination - Best Art Direction: Kim Yu-jeong, Lee Min-bok

2008 Baeksang Arts Awards
Nomination - Best New Director: Jung Sik, Jung Bum-shik

2008 Grand Bell Awards
Nomination - Best Music: Park Yeong-ran
Nomination - Best Visual Effects: Kim Gwang-su

2008 Golden Cinematography Awards
Best New Actor: Jin Goo

References

External links
  
 
 
 

2007 films
2007 horror films
South Korean horror anthology films
2000s Korean-language films
Films set in 1942
Films set in 1979
Films set in Korea under Japanese rule
2000s South Korean films